Goran Ivanišević was the defending champion but lost in the semifinals to Daniel Vacek.

Richard Krajicek won in the final 7–6(7–4), 7–6(7–5) against Vacek.

Seeds
A champion seed is indicated in bold text while text in italics indicates the round in which that seed was eliminated.

  Goran Ivanišević (semifinals)
  Richard Krajicek (champion)
  Thomas Enqvist (semifinals)
  Jan Siemerink (first round)
  Àlex Corretja (first round)
  Paul Haarhuis (first round)
  Cédric Pioline (first round)
  Petr Korda (quarterfinals)

Draw

External links
 1997 ABN AMRO World Tennis Tournament draw

1997 ABN AMRO World Tennis Tournament
1997 ATP Tour